Eric Ernest Porter  (June 19, 1911 — May 1, 1983) was an Australian filmmaker and animator who specialised in documentaries and commercials, but also made several features. He directed Australia's first animated feature, Marco Polo Junior Versus the Red Dragon (1972). That film's financial failure forced him to close his animation studio.

Porter was made a Member of the Order of Australia (AM) with effect December 20, 1983 in the 1984 Australia Day Honours for "service to the film industry particularly in the field of animation".

Select filmography
A Son is Born (1946) – producer, director
Marco Polo Junior Versus the Red Dragon (1972) – director, producer
The Yellow House (TV series)
Polly Me Love (1976) (TV movie)

References

External links

Eric Porter at National Film and Sound Archive
Eric Porter Productions at National Film and Sound Archive

Australian animated film directors
Australian animated film producers
Australian television directors
1911 births
1983 deaths
Members of the Order of Australia